Heathsville Historic District is a national historic district located at Heathsville, Northumberland County, Virginia. The district includes 81 contributing buildings, 12 contributing sites, 4 contributing structures, and 4 contributing objects in the county seat of Northumberland County.  It is an assemblage of residential, commercial, and government buildings dating from the 18th through 20th centuries in a variety of popular architectural styles.  The linear district is centered on the courthouse square.  Notable buildings include the Northumberland Court House (1851, 1900–1901), the old county jail (1844), the former
Methodist Protestant Church (c. 1855–60), Harding House, Belleville, Heathsville Masonic Lodge No. 109 (1894), Bank of Northumberland (1924), and the Heathsville United Methodist Church (1894). Located in the district and separately listed are Rice's Hotel, Oakley, St. Stephen's Church, Sunnyside, and The Academy.

It was listed on the National Register of Historic Places in 1992.

References

Historic districts in Northumberland County, Virginia
Federal architecture in Virginia
Greek Revival architecture in Virginia
Italianate architecture in Virginia
National Register of Historic Places in Northumberland County, Virginia
Historic districts on the National Register of Historic Places in Virginia